Parwan University is located in Charikar, capital of Parwan province, central Afghanistan. It was established in 2006. Parwan university has faculties of Economics, Agriculture, Engineering, Computer Science, Islamic Shariia, Language & Literature, Journalism, Social Sciences, Law, and Education.

It Has About 6-7 Thousands Students, With Around 300 Lecturers. 10 Faculties with 31 Departments.

It Has A Mosque, a Research Farm (Agricultural Activities), an Internet Club, IT Center, Library, Conference Halls, a cafeteria, a publication office, separated hostels for boys and girls and other facilities.

Departments of Faculty of Computer Science:

IT (Information technology)

IS (Information System)

Departments of Faculty Of Engineering:

Civil Engineering

Construction of Cities

Departments of Faculty of Language & Literature:

Pashto

Dari (Persian)

Arabic

English

French

Departments of Faculty of Journalism:

Radio & Television

Press (News)Departments of Faculty of Economics:
  Banking
  Management and Administration

Departments of Faculty of Agriculture:
  Horticulture
  Agri-economics and extension
  Animal Sciences
  Plant Sciences

Departments of Faculty of Education:
  Biology
  Chemistry
  Maths
  Geography
  History
  Islamic Culture
  Arts
  Vocational Studies

See also 
List of universities in Afghanistan
Computer science faculty
 - Information technology
 - Information System

References

Universities in Afghanistan
University
2006 establishments in Afghanistan
Educational institutions established in 2006